{{DISPLAYTITLE:C12H16N2}}
The molecular formula C12H16N2 (molar mass: 188.26 g/mol, exact mass: 188.131349 u) may refer to:

 Dimethyltryptamine
 α,N-DMT
 2,α-DMT, a tryptamine
 N-Ethyltryptamine
 α-Ethyltryptamine, a tryptamine
 Fenproporex
 Ipidacrine
 4-Methyl-AMT
 RJR-2429